Caloptilia callicarpae is a moth of the family Gracillariidae. It is known from Japan (Shikoku, the Ryukyu Islands).

The wingspan is 6.5-8.2 mm.

The larvae feed on Callicarpa species, including Callicarpa japonica. They mine the leaves of their host plant. The mine occurs on the upper surface of the leaf. It starts long-linear, epidermal and running along the leaf vein or leaf margin, thereupon it broadens into an elongate blotch, usually located along the leaf margin and tentiformed and sometimes completely folded upwardly. The cocoon is found at a position separated from the mine. In rearing condition it was found at the tip or margin of the mining leaf. It is boat-shaped and whitish.

References

callicarpae
Moths described in 1982
Moths of Japan